Chun Young-soo (Korean: 전영수; born February 19, 1963, in South Korea) is a South Korean former footballer who played as a forward.

He started professional career at Ulsan Hyundai, then known as Hyundai Horangi in 1986 and he transferred to Yukong Elephants in April 1989.

He was winner of Top assists award in 1986 Professional Football Championship

References

External links 
 

1963 births
Living people
Association football forwards
Ulsan Hyundai FC players
Jeju United FC players
K League 1 players
South Korean footballers
Sungkyunkwan University alumni
Place of birth missing (living people)